Once machos 2 is a 2019 Peruvian sports comedy film directed by Aldo Miyashiro and written by Miyashiro and Marco Paulo Melendez. It is a sequel to the 2017 Peruvian film Once machos. It stars Aldo Miyashiro, Pietro Sibille, André Silva and Cristian Rivero. It premiered on February 14, 2019, in Peruvian theaters.

Synopsis 
The Once Machos will have to face off on the field against the "Villain", who has kidnapped their children. Now, only a victory will make them see their creatures alive again.

Cast 
The actors participating in this film are:

 Aldo Miyashiro as Alejandro
 Pietro Sibille as 'Mono'
 Cristian Rivero as Cris
 Erika Villalobos as Beatriz
 André Silva as Andy
 Junior Silva as Junior
 Andrés Salas as 'Chato'
 Sebastian Monteghirfo as Sebas
 Pablo Villanueva “Melcochita” as 'Huapayita'
 Gilberto Nué as Gil
 Wendy Vásquez as Tatiana
 Natalie Vértiz as Natalia

Production 
The filming of the film began on July 10, 2018, and ended at the end of August 2018.

Reception 
Once machos 2 drew more than 67,000 viewers on its first day in theaters. In its opening weekend, the film drew 179,000 viewers to the theater. At the end of the year, the film attracts more than 650,000 spectators to the cinema, becoming the most watched Peruvian film of 2019.

Future 
After the success of the sequel, a third part was announced, which will begin filming in 2020, along with a new series titled Once machos, la serie (Eleven males, the series) to premiere in 2020. but they were never released, and it is unknown what happened to these projects. In October 2021, a real soccer team called Once Machos FC was formed.

References

External links 

 

2019 films
2019 comedy films
Peruvian sports comedy films
2010s Spanish-language films
2010s Peruvian films
Films set in Peru
Films shot in Peru
Films about friendship
Films about kidnapping
Films about sportspeople
Peruvian sequel films